American country music singer Jon Pardi has released four studio albums, two extended plays, and fourteen singles, including two as a featured artist. He debuted in 2012 with "Missin' You Crazy", a song which charted within the top 30 of Billboard Hot Country Songs and Country Airplay. He would go on to release three more singles from what would become his debut album Write You a Song.

Pardi's second album, California Sunrise (2014), accounted for his first number-one hit on Country Airplay with 2015's "Head Over Boots"; followup "Dirt on My Boots" would also reach the top of that chart one year later. His third studio album, Heartache Medication, would go on to account for his third solo number-one hit in its title track in 2020. That same year, he also topped the charts as a featured vocalist on Thomas Rhett's "Beer Can't Fix".

Studio albums

Extended plays

Singles

As lead artist

As featured artist

Promotional singles

Other Guest Appearances

Music videos

Notes

References

Discographies of American artists
Country music discographies